Karel Voolaid (born 4 July 1977) is an Estonian football manager and former player. He is the current manager of Paide Linnameeskond.

Managerial career

Estonia youth teams
Voolaid has managed Estonia's under-15s, under-16s, under-19s, under-21s and under-23s.

Estonia
On 3 July 2019, the Estonian Football Association appointed Voolaid as manager of the Estonia national team until the end of the qualifying tournament for the UEFA Euro 2020.

Managerial statistics

References

External links

1977 births
Living people
People from Järva Parish
Association football midfielders
Estonian footballers
Estonian football managers
Esiliiga players
Meistriliiga players
Paide Linnameeskond players
Estonia national football team managers